Fisherman's Friends: The Musical is a stage musical with a book by Amanda Whittington based on the true story and music of the folk-music group Fisherman's Friends and the 2019 film Fisherman's Friends.

Production history

World premiere: Truro, Cornwall (2021) 
In January 2021, it was announced the musical would have its world premiere at the Cornwall Playhouse in the Hall for Cornwall, Truro beginning previews from 13 October 2021 with an official press night on 18 October 2021, running until 30 October. The production was the first to open the theatre following a major £20 million refurbishment. The production was directed by James Grieve, designed by Lucy Osborne with musical supervision by David White. Full casting was announced on 12 September 2021.The sold-out season broke box-office records in Hall for Cornwall.

UK and Ireland tour and Toronto (2022-23) 
The musical began a UK and Ireland Tour on 1st September 2022 beginning at the Theatre Royal, Plymouth touring until 13 May 2023. Full casting was announced on 26 July 2022.

The musical will also make its North American premiere at the Royal Alexandra Theatre in Toronto, Canada running from November 27, 2022 until January 15, 2023.

Musical numbers 
The songs from the musical are including sea-shanties that have both been made famous by the group, as well as having been sung by them; some of the songs have been embellished for the stage, being performed more emotionally, with adapted lyrics or even in a different musical style, while all of the music heard is performed live by the on-stage company.

Act I
 "Nelson's Blood"
 "Pass Around the Grog"
 "Village by the Sea"
 "(What shall we Do with the) Drunken Sailor"
 "Widow Woman"
 "John Kanaka"
 "Bully in the Alley"
 "Leave her Johnny, Leave her"
 "Pay Me My Money Down"
 "A Ship in Distress"
 "Rattling Winches"
 "St Piran's Flag"
 "Cousin Jack"
 "One and All"
 "Little Liz (I Love You)"
 "Sloop John B"
 "South Australia"

Act II
 "John Kanaka"
 "Cadgwith Anthem (Robbers Retreat)"
 "Sailor ain't a Sailor"
 "Haul away Joe"
 "Shanty Man / Safe and Sound"
 "Crossing the Bar"
 "Blow the Man Down"
 "Home from the Sea"
 "The Leaving Shanty"
 "Fisherman's Blues"
 "Village by the Sea (Reprise)"
 "No Hopers, Jokers & Rogues"

Cast and characters

External links 

 Official website

References 

2021 musicals
British musicals
Musicals inspired by real-life events